William Jonathan Niedig (1870–1955) was a professor, poet, and author in the United States. He was born in Iowa, taught at the Stanford and the University of Wisconsin in Madison, and became a freelance writer. His 1919 book The Fire Flingers was adapted to film. In 1906, University of Wisconsin professor Henry Lathrop nominated him for the Nobel Prize in literature for his book of poems titled The First Wardens.

In 1900 he reviewed a collection of stories by Charles W. Chestnut. He wrote about Shakespeare's work and what is known as the False Folio. In September 1923, one of his stories was published in The Saturday Evening Post. He wrote poetry.

Bibliography
The First Wardens, poems, Stanford University Press (1901)
False dates on Shakspere quartos ; a new method of proof applied to a controversy of scholars (1910)The Fire Flingers (1919)The Chrysalis''

References

1870 births
1955 deaths
American poets
University of Wisconsin–Madison faculty
Stanford University faculty